Maximilian Güll (born 5 January 1995) is a German footballer who plays for 1. FC Bocholt in Regionalliga West.

References

External links
 

1995 births
Living people
German footballers
Association football defenders
MSV Duisburg players
Borussia Dortmund II players
3. Liga players
Germany youth international footballers
Footballers from Duisburg